The Fog is a 1980 American supernatural horror film directed by John Carpenter, who also co-wrote the screenplay and created the music for the film. It stars Adrienne Barbeau, Jamie Lee Curtis, Tom Atkins, Janet Leigh and Hal Holbrook. It tells the story of a strange, glowing fog that sweeps over a small coastal town in Northern California, bringing with it the vengeful ghosts of leprous mariners who were killed in a shipwreck there a century before.

Filmed in the spring of 1979, The Fog was scheduled to be released at Christmas that year by AVCO Embassy Pictures, but its release date was delayed to February 1, 1980. The film divided critics upon release, receiving praise for its visuals and acting, and criticism for its structure and screenplay. Despite mixed reviews, the film grossed $21.3 million domestically.

The Fog contains themes of revenge and repressed corrupt historical events resurfacing in contemporary small-town America. In the years since its original release, it has been noted for establishing a cult following. A remake was released in 2005.

Plot

Right before midnight, on the eve of the 100th anniversary of the founding of the small coastal town of Antonio Bay in Northern California, Mr. Machen tells ghost stories to children by a campfire on the beach.  One of the stories is about a local ship that had crashed against the rocks, causing all of its crew to drown, after mistaking a campfire for a lighthouse.  Paranormal activity then begins around the town starting at midnight, which results in the town priest, Father Malone, discovering his grandfather's diary at the church after a piece of masonry falls from the wall. The journal reveals that in 1880, the six founders of Antonio Bay (including Malone's grandfather) deliberately wrecked a clipper ship named the Elizabeth Dane, so that its wealthy, leprosy-afflicted owner Blake would not establish a leper colony nearby. The conspirators used some of the gold plundered from the ship to found the town.

Meanwhile, three fishermen are out at sea when a strange, glowing fog envelops their trawler. The fog brings with it the Elizabeth Dane, carrying the vengeful revenants of Blake and his crew, who kill the fishermen. Meanwhile, town resident Nick Castle is driving his truck home and picks up a young hitchhiker named Elizabeth Solley. As they drive towards town, all the truck's windows inexplicably shatter.

The following morning, local radio DJ Stevie Wayne is given a piece of driftwood by her son Andy; it is inscribed with the word "DANE", and Andy says he found it on the beach. Intrigued, Stevie takes it with her to the lighthouse where she broadcasts her radio show. She sets the wood down next to a tape player that is playing, but the wood inexplicably begins to seep water, causing the tape player to short circuit. A mysterious man's voice emerges from the tape player swearing revenge, and the words "6 must die" appear on the wood before it bursts into flame. Stevie quickly extinguishes the fire, but she then sees that the wood once again reads "DANE" and the tape player begins working normally again.

After locating the missing trawler, Nick and Elizabeth find the corpse of one of the fishermen, Dick Baxter, with his eyes gouged out. The other two are missing, one of whom is the husband of Kathy Williams, who is overseeing the town's centennial celebrations.  While Elizabeth is alone in the autopsy room, Baxter's corpse rises from the autopsy table and approaches her, before collapsing. As Elizabeth screams, Nick and coroner Dr. Phibes rush into the room where they see the once-again lifeless corpse has carved the number 3 on the floor. That evening, as the town's celebrations begin, local weatherman Dan calls Stevie at the radio station to tell her that another fog bank has appeared and is moving towards town. As they are talking, the fog gathers outside the weather station and Dan hears a knock at the door. He answers it and is killed by the revenants as Stevie listens in horror. As Stevie proceeds with her radio show, the fog starts moving inland, disrupting the town's telephone and power lines. Using a backup generator, Stevie begs her listeners to go to her house and save her son when she sees the fog closing in from her lighthouse vantage point. As the fog envelops Stevie's house, the revenants kill her son's babysitter, Mrs. Kobritz. They then pursue Andy, but Nick and Elizabeth arrive and rescue him.

Stevie advises everyone to head to the town's church through her broadcast. Once inside, Nick, Elizabeth, Andy, Kathy, her assistant Sandy and Father Malone take refuge in a back room as the fog arrives outside. Inside the room, they locate a gold cross in the wall cavity which is made from the rest of the stolen gold. As the revenants begin their attack, Malone takes the gold cross out into the chapel. Knowing that they have returned to take six lives in lieu of the six original conspirators who led them to their deaths, Malone offers the gold and himself to Blake to spare the others. At the lighthouse, more revenants attack Stevie, trapping her on the roof. Inside the church, Blake seizes the gold cross, which begins to glow. Nick pulls Malone away from the cross seconds before it disappears in a blinding flash of light along with Blake and his crew. The revenants at the lighthouse also disappear, and the fog vanishes. Stevie gets down from the roof and makes it back to safety.

After Elizabeth, Nick, Andy, Kathy and Sandy leave the church, Malone contemplates why he was spared by Blake and asks "Why not six?" given that there have been only five deaths. However, moments later, the fog reappears inside the church along with the revenants and Blake decapitates Malone as the screen cuts to black.

Cast

Themes and interpretations
The Fogs central themes are revenge and the resurfacing of "repressed past events" in small-town America, as it focuses on the supernatural vengeance inflicted on the residents of a community that has prospered from looted salvage. William Fischer of Collider describes the film as one preoccupied with "an all-American town getting ready to celebrate its founding, a founding marred by a dark crime. When Father Patrick Malone discovers the horrible truth and brings it to the attention of Mayor Kathy Williams, she shrugs it off and dismisses any impact or introspection it might cast over the centenary. It was so long ago, she reasons, and what is there to do about it? And she has a point; there’s no changing the past, and at a certain distance, there’s no rectifying it."

Writer Peter Hutchings notes that, while the film contains these implicit themes, that Carpenter is "more interested in conjuring up a sinister atmosphere than he is in exploring some of the social ramifications of such a story".

Production

Development
The initial inspiration for The Fog came to Carpenter when he and his collaborator and then-girlfriend, Debra Hill, were promoting their film Assault on Precinct 13 (1976) in England; the two visited Stonehenge during the trip, where they witnessed an eerie fog rolling over the landscape from a distance.  Carpenter stated that he drew additional inspiration for the story from the British film The Trollenberg Terror (1958), which dealt with monsters hiding in the clouds. 
 
In the DVD audio commentary for the film, Carpenter noted that the story of the deliberate wreckage of a ship and its subsequent plundering was based on an actual event (the wrecking of the Frolic) that took place in the 19th century near Goleta, California (this event was portrayed more directly in the 1975 Tom Laughlin film, The Master Gunfighter). The premise also bears strong resemblances to Massimo Pupillo's 1965 Terror-Creatures from the Grave as well as the John Greenleaf Whittier poem The Wreck of the Palatine which appeared in The Atlantic Monthly in 1867, about the wreck of the ship Princess Augusta in 1738, at Block Island, within Rhode Island.

Carpenter named multiple characters in the screenplay after people with whom he had collaborated on previous projects. Among them are Dan O'Bannon, a screenwriter who worked with Carpenter on Dark Star (1974); Nick Castle, who portrayed Michael Myers in Halloween; Tommy Wallace, an editor, sound designer, and art designer who worked on Dark Star and Assault on Precinct 13, as well as several other subsequent projects. The babysitter in the film, Mrs. Kobritz, is named after Richard Kobritz, who produced Carpenter's 1978 television film Someone's Watching Me!.

Other references that are interwoven into the film include the name of the John Houseman character "Mr. Machen" (a reference to Welsh horror fantasist Arthur Machen); a radio report that mentions Arkham Reef; and the town's coroner Dr. Phibes was named after the titular character of the horror films starring Vincent Price from the early 1970s.

The Fog was part of a two-picture deal with AVCO Embassy Pictures, along with Escape from New York (1981).

Casting
Cast as the female lead was Adrienne Barbeau, Carpenter's wife, who had appeared in Carpenter's TV movie Someone's Watching Me! in 1978. This was her first feature film. Barbeau also appeared in Carpenter's next film, Escape from New York (1981).

Tom Atkins, a friend of Barbeau's, was cast as Nick Castle. The Fog was Atkins' first appearance in a Carpenter film, and he also appeared in Carpenter's next film, Escape from New York (1981) as well as Halloween III: Season of the Witch (1982), which was produced and scored by Carpenter.

Jamie Lee Curtis, who was the main star of Carpenter's 1978 hit Halloween, appeared as Elizabeth. Commenting on the role and on appearing in another of Carpenter's films, she said "That's what I love about John. He's letting me explore different aspects of myself. I'm spoiled rotten now. My next director is going to be almost a letdown." In a retrospective interview, Curtis stated that her part was written into the film by Carpenter, who felt sympathy for her after the success of Halloween had failed to lead to her obtaining other roles.

This was the first collaboration between Carpenter and character actor George Buck Flower, who would go on to appear in four more films directed by Carpenter: Escape from New York (1981), Starman (1984), They Live (1988) and Village of the Damned (1995).

Filming

Filming took place from April to May 1979 at Raleigh Studios in Hollywood, California (interior scenes) and on location at several other cities in California, including Point Reyes; Bolinas; Inverness; and the Episcopal Church of the Ascension in Sierra Madre. The original production budget was approximately $900,000.

The film was shot by cinematographer Dean Cundey, and Carpenter stated the appearance of the film was inspired by the Val Lewton-produced horror films I Walked with a Zombie (1943) and Isle of the Dead (1945), which he described as "very shadowy, all suggestion, and he has all sorts of melodrama going. I was a real fan of that sort of thing." Although a lower-budget independent film, Carpenter chose to shoot in the anamorphic 2.35:1 format to elevate its visual appearance.

Post-production
After viewing a rough cut of the film, Carpenter was dissatisfied with the results. Recalling the experience, Carpenter commented "It was terrible. I had a movie that didn't work, and I knew it in my heart". 

Carpenter subsequently added the prologue with Mr. Machen (John Houseman) telling ghost stories to fascinated children by a campfire (Houseman played a similar role in the opening of the 1981 film Ghost Story), which was filmed on a soundstage. Carpenter added several other new scenes and re-shot others in order to make the film more comprehensible, more frightening, and gorier. Among the additions were the sequence in which Curtis's character is approached by a walking-dead corpse in the morgue, as well as the finale in which Barbeau's character ascends to the roof of the lighthouse to escape the mariner ghosts.

Carpenter and Debra Hill said the necessity of a re-shoot became especially clear to them after they realized that The Fog would have to compete with horror films that had high gore content. Approximately one-third of the finished film is the additional footage completed during reshoots. The reshoots increased the film's budget from $900,000 to $1.1 million.

Music

Carpenter's musical score for The Fog features prominent synthesizer and elements of drone music, and was largely composed in the key of A minor. As the film progresses, its score shifts to the key of B major and features a flatter pitch. The score has been released on compact disc and vinyl in several different editions since the film's release.

Release

Marketing
In addition to the final $1.1 million production budget, AVCO Embassy spent over $3 million solely on advertising which included TV spots, radio spots, print ads, and even the placement of fog machines (costing £350 each) in the lobbies of selected theaters where the film was showing. A further undisclosed amount was spent on 600 prints of the film, 540 of which were distributed to American cinemas. Originally, the film was set for released during Christmas 1979, but AVCO Embassy president Bob Rehme opted to wait until February 1980 when there would be less major box office competition from other films and more theater screens available.

Box office

The film was given a staggered release in various cities by AVCO Embassy Pictures beginning February 1, 1980, before expanding to further locations later that month. Its theatrical run lasted a total of 152 weeks, and it ultimately grossed $21.3 million between the United States and Canada.

Critical response

Contemporaneous
Upon its original release, The Fog received mixed responses from film critics. Ernest Leogrande of the New York Daily News gave the film a middling two out of four-star review, praising the performances but writing that "Carpenter obviously is entranced by ghost stories, but he seems willing to sacrifice story for effect." Kevin Thomas of the Los Angeles Times similarly lauded the acting, and complimented the film as "an elegant and scary thriller of the supernatural that's far more impressive and satisfying than Carpenter's grisly and pointless (but profitable) Halloween."

The New York Timess Vincent Canby praised the film's visual elements, but felt it ultimately paled in comparison to Carpenter's Halloween, describing it as "neither a rewarding ghost story nor...  science-fiction, though it borrows freely from both genres... Unlike Halloween, which was a model of straight-forward terror and carefully controlled suspense, The Fog is constructed of random diversions. There are too many story lines, which necessitate so much cross-cutting that no one sequence can ever build to a decent climax." In his 1980 review, Roger Ebert gave the film two out of four stars, commenting, "This isn't a great movie but it does show great promise from Carpenter." Similarly, Leonard Maltin rated the film 2-stars-out-of-4 and called it a "well-directed but obvious ghost story."

Reassessment
In the years following its release, The Fog has amassed a cult following, and later came to be considered, as Carpenter opined regarding his creation, "a minor horror classic" though he also stated it was not his favorite film due to re-shoots and low production values. This is one of the reasons he agreed to the 2005 remake. 

, the review aggregator website Rotten Tomatoes reports a 75% approval rating, with an average rating of 6.6/10 based on 67 reviews. The consensus reads, "A well-crafted return to horror for genre giant John Carpenter, The Fog rolls in and wraps viewers in suitably slow-building chills." 

In a 2002 review (for the DVD release of the film), Slant Magazine reviewer Ed Gonzalez gave the film 3.5 stars out of 4 and stated that "Carpenter's use of 2.35:1 anamorphic widescreen is beyond legendary and his compositions evoke a town that may as well be the last remaining one on the face of the earth."

In the early 2010s, Time Out conducted a poll of over 100 authors, directors, actors and critics who have worked within the horror genre to vote for their top horror films. The Fog placed at number 77 on their top 100 list.

Zombiemania: 80 Movies to Die For author Arnold T. Blumberg wrote that the film was "a very effective small scale chiller" and "an attempt to capture the essence of a typical spooky American folktale while simultaneously paying homage to the EC Comics of the 1950s and the then very recent Italian zombie influx."

Home media
The Fog has been released on various home video formats since the early 1980s: Magnetic Video released it on betamax and VHS in the fall of 1980, Embassy Home Entertainment reissued the film again on VHS in 1985. MGM Home Entertainment released the film on VHS in 2000 before issuing a special edition DVD in August 2002. Another special edition DVD was released in Europe in 2004. 

Scream Factory released the film on Blu-ray in July 2013, before reissuing it on 4K UHD on September 13, 2022 in both standard and limited steelbook editions.

Novelization
A novelization of the movie, written by Dennis Etchison, was published by Bantam Books in January 1980. The novel clarifies the implication in the film that the six who must die were not random but in fact descendants of the six original conspirators.

Remake

In 2005, the film was remade under the direction of Rupert Wainwright with a screenplay by Cooper Layne and starring Tom Welling and Maggie Grace. Though based on Carpenter and Hill's original screenplay, the remake was made more in the vein of a "teen horror film" and given a PG-13 rating (the original film was rated R). Green-lit by Revolution Studios with just eighteen pages of script written, the film was panned for its poor script and acting and has a Rotten Tomatoes rating of 4%.

See also
 List of ghost films

References

Sources

External links

  at the Official John Carpenter Website
 
 
 
 
  at Mubi 

1980 films
1980s American films
1980s English-language films
1980s ghost films
1980 horror films
1980s horror thriller films
1980 independent films
1980s mystery films
American films about revenge
American ghost films
American independent films
American mystery films
American supernatural horror films
American zombie films
Embassy Pictures films
Films about Catholic priests
Films about seafaring accidents or incidents
Films directed by John Carpenter
Films produced by Debra Hill
Films set in California
Films shot in California
Films scored by John Carpenter
Films with screenplays by John Carpenter
Films with screenplays by Debra Hill
Northern California in fiction
Works about leprosy